Mount Etna Morris (September 1, 1900 – July 8, 1988) was an American politician from Missouri. A Democrat, he served three non-consecutive terms as State Treasurer of Missouri as well as two non-consecutive terms as Director of the Missouri Department of Revenue and two terms in the Missouri House of Representatives.

Early life and education
Morris was born September 1, 1900 in Dadeville, Missouri to hardware merchant Albert G. Morris and his wife. He had two siblings; a brother A. George Morris, an official with the Missouri Department of Conservation, and a sister Lucille Morris Upton, an author and newspaper reporter. Following graduation from Walnut Grove High School, Morris served in the military during World War I. After his military service, Morris attended Southwest Missouri State College in Springfield and later the University of Missouri. On December 24, 1922, he married the former Helen Adamson of Everton, Missouri, and had two children. In April, 1967, he married Margery Lott Adamson, the widow of one of his first wife's relatives.

Business and politics
In 1928, Morris founded and managed the People's Bank in Miller, Missouri. From 1932 to 1936, he served two terms in the Missouri House of Representatives. Following his service in the state legislature, he served as CEO of the Trenton National Bank from 1936 to 1945. He re-joined state government in 1945, serving for a year as commissioner of the state Division of Finance, before becoming the first director of the newly created Missouri Department of Revenue in the Cabinet of Governor Phil M. Donnelly in July, 1946, serving until his election as state treasurer. From 1949 to 1953, he served as State Treasurer of Missouri. He served again as director of the state Department of Revenue from 1953 to 1956, during Phil Donnelly's second term as governor, before resigning in order to seek a second term as state treasurer, which he served from 1957 to 1961. He was subsequently reelected to a third term as state treasurer, serving from 1965 to 1969.

References

1900 births
1988 deaths
Democratic Party members of the Missouri House of Representatives
State cabinet secretaries of Missouri
State treasurers of Missouri
People from Dade County, Missouri
People from Lawrence County, Missouri
University of Missouri alumni
20th-century American politicians
American military personnel of World War I
Military personnel from Missouri